Guitarridae is a family of sponges belonging to the order Poecilosclerida.

Genera:
 Coelodischela Vacelet, Vasseur & Lévi, 1976
 Guitarra Carter, 1874
 Tetrapocillon Brøndsted, 1924

References

Sponges